John Simon may refer to:

Arts and entertainment
John Simon (composer) (born 1944), classical composer and poet
John Simon (critic) (1925–2019), American author and critic
John Simon (record producer) (born 1941), record producer for Columbia Records
John F. Simon Jr. (born 1963), American artist and creator of Unfolding Object

Politicians and peers
John Simon (died 1524), MP for Exeter
John Simon (MP for Dewsbury) (1818–1897), British politician
John Simon, 1st Viscount Simon (1873–1954), Lord Chancellor of Great Britain, 1940–1945
Two of his descendants who have held the title of Viscount Simon

Sports
John Simon (rugby league) (born 1972), Australian former professional rugby league footballer
John Simon (running back) (born 1978), American football running back
John Simon (linebacker) (born 1990), American football linebacker
John L. Simon, U.S. national swimming coach

Others
John Simon (engraver) (1675–1751), Anglo-French engraver
Sir John Simon (pathologist) (1816–1904), Chief Medical Officer (United Kingdom), 1855–1876
John Y. Simon (1933–2008), American Civil War scholar
John Douglas Simon (born 1957), president of Lehigh University
Jonathan Simon, UC Berkeley Law professor

See also
John Simons (born 1956), British radio executive
John Simons (chemist) (born 1934), British physical chemist
Jack Simons (1882–1948), Australian businessman, sports administrator and politician
Jonathan Simons, American oncologist